"An Englishman in New York" is a song by Godley & Creme, from their 1979 album Freeze Frame. It is memorable for an innovative self-produced music video which involved Godley singing in front of Creme, as Creme conducted mannequins dressed up as members of a 1930s big band orchestra. This feature is a homage to scenes from the 1971 film The Abominable Dr. Phibes, directed by Robert Fuest.

Charts

Weekly charts

Year-end charts

References

External links
 Full length music video (YouTube)

1979 songs
1979 singles
Godley & Creme songs
Songs about New York City
Songs written by Kevin Godley
Songs written by Lol Creme
Polydor Records singles